Sergio Tovar Velarde, (born 31 December 1982) is a Mexican film director. He directed the feature film Mi último día (aka Aurora Boreal) which was premiered at the San Sebastián International Film Festival and was released commercially in theaters in summer of 2009.

He is one of the filmmakers of The Misfits, alongside Javier Colinas, Marco Polo Constandse and Jorge Ramírez Suárez.

Early life
Tovar was born in Tepic, Nayarit, Mexico. He studied communications at Ibero-American University in Mexico City and film theory at Centro de Capacitación Cinematográfica. He studied directing with well-known Polish film director Ludwik Margules.

In 2009, became FONCA's scholar. In 2009, 2006 and 2002 was FECAN's academic.

Career
Despite his early efforts for direct amateur short films, his first professional short film was not made until 1999: Carolina. In June, 2002; work besides Roberto Cobo in KCL, Doce y Cuarto and the film premiere became the last tribute for the actor.

Tovar has been directing short films in France, Canada, Cuba and Mexico; being selected and nominated on 70 film festivals. In 2008, his short film Edén became part of the Best of International Award-winning films in Cannes Short Film.

In 2011, Tovar direct The Misfits, a film composed of 4 contributions from different filmmakers. His last film is Four Moons

Filmography
Extracted from IMDb

Feature films
 2014 - Four Moons (México)
 2011 - The Misfits (Los inadaptados) (Chat segment) (México)
 2007 - My Last Day Aka Aurora Boreal (México)

Short films
 2012 - Papi Florida (Cuba)
 2011 - Jet Lag (Mexico)
 2011 - Infinito (Mexico)
 2010 - La femme qui pleure (Canada)
 2008 - L'esprit hanté (Canada)
 2007 - Edén  (Mexico) 
 2006 - El joven Telarañas (Mexico)
 2006 - El gusano (Mexico)
 2005 - La voz de las cigarras (Mexico) 
 2003 - KCL, doce y cuarto (Mexico)
 2001 - La danza de las salamandras (Mexico)
 2000 - Carolina (Mexico)

Awards

Biarritz International Festival of Latin America Cinema

Cancún International Film Festival

 Guadalajara International Film Festival

Guanajuato International Film Festival 

Habana International Film Festival

Huelva Latin American Film Festival

Kinoki Film Festival

Mexican Cinema Journalists

Morelia International Film Festival 

New York Short Film Festival

Pantalla de Cristal Film Festival

San Sebastian International Film Festival 

Short Shorts Film Festival México

Toulouse Latin America Film Festival

WorldFest-Houston International Film Festival

Trivia
- In 2002, he and the producer Edgar Barrón founded Atko Films in Mexico City, as a film production company.
- In 2010, Tovar was included on Top Ten decade Nayarit people list.

References

External links 
 
 
 
Vimeo Channel
YouTube Channel
Blog
Atko Films
Four Moons - Official Site
My Last Day - Official Site
The Misfits - Official Site

1982 births
Living people
Mexican film directors